Charles II de Croÿ (31 July 1522 – Quiévrain, 24 June 1551) was Seigneur de Croÿ, 2nd Duke of Aarschot, 3rd Prince of Chimay and 3rd Count of Beaumont.

He was the eldest son of Philippe II de Croÿ, Duke of Aarschot, and Anne de Croÿ, Princess of Chimay.
After his mother's death in 1539, he inherited the Principality of Chimay, and after his father's death in 1549, the Duchy of Aarschot, thus uniting for the first time the two great titles of the House of Croÿ .

He married in 1541 Louise of Lorraine (1521–1542), daughter of Claude, Duke of Guise and Antoinette de Bourbon. After the early death of Louise, he married Antoinette of Burgundy (1529–1588) in 1549. Antoinette was the sister of Maximilian II of Burgundy, who was married to Charles' sister, Louise de Croÿ (1524–1585).
 
Charles de Croÿ was murdered in 1551 in Quiévrain. Because he had no children, all his titles and possessions went to his younger brother Philippe III de Croÿ. His widow later married Jacques d’Anneux, Seigneur d‘Aubencourt.

References

Sources

External links

Genealogy (in French)

1522 births
1551 deaths
Princes of Chimay
Dukes of Aarschot